Bolshoy Patom is a selo (village) in Bodaybinsky District of Irkutsk Oblast, Russia. It is part of the Zhuinsky Municipal Unit. Population:

Geography 
It lies on the right bank of the Bolshoy Patom river, at the northeastern end of the Patom Highlands.

References

External links 
Большой-Патом (winter)

Rural localities in Irkutsk Oblast